Sarcodon quercophilus is a species of tooth fungus in the family Bankeraceae. Found in Belize, where it grows on the ground in mountainous cloud forest under oak, it was described as new to science in 2015.

References

External links

Fungi described in 2015
Fungi of Central America
quercophilus